John Samuel may refer to:
 John Samuel (rugby union), Welsh rugby union player
 John S. Samuel, United States Air Force general
 Sir John Smith Samuel, Scottish master of ceremonies

See also
 Samuel John, Indian actor and theatre activist